The Minister for Civil Protection and Maritime Policies (Italian: Ministro per la Protezione Civile e Politiche del mare) is one of the positions in the Italian government. The minister coordinates the relations between the government and Italian Civil Protection.

The current minister is Nello Musumeci, a member of the Brothers of Italy, who held the office since 22 October 2022 in the cabinet of Giorgia Meloni. The first and longest-serving minister was Giuseppe Zamberletti, widely considered as the founder of Italian Civil Protection.

List of Ministers
 Parties

Coalitions:

References

Civil Protection